Silas Canyon is a canyon in the Wind River mountain range near Lander, Wyoming in the United States.

The canyon is a long glacial-carved trough with numerous lakes, which makes it a popular destination for
backpackers and fishermen. The  Thumb Lake sits at its head.

Plant life
Silas Canyon and the surrounding area is home the various plant species common in the Southern Wind River Mountains. Whitebark pine and Lodgepole pine are the predominant tree species.

References 

Canyons and gorges of Wyoming
Landforms of Fremont County, Wyoming